John Cameron Peddie, (1887 – 1968) known as "J Cameron Peddie", was born on 17 May 1887 at Conland, Forgue, Aberdeenshire. He is the author of the book "The Forgotten Talent" which is an autobiographical work with emphasis on the Biblical practice of "Laying on of hands" to obtain healing for the afflicted.

Early years 
Peddie’s desire to be a preacher began when he was just seven years of age. He and some of his young friends would play at "Gospel Meetings", a game in which one boy would kneel encircled by the others and act as the preacher. During one of these games, Peddie made an appeal to God in what he later referred to as his "First original prayer". The appeal was that God would make him a preacher of the Gospel.

Education 
In 1901 at the age of 14, Peddie reached the stage where he had to decide whether to continue his studies or go out into the world and earn a living. He managed to secure a County Council Bursary for £20 – approx. £860 in today’s money – which made further education possible. At this point, Peddie felt daunted at the prospect of leaving the security of his home area for the city of Aberdeen. He would state later that prayer brought him the necessary courage to go forward.

Peddie not only completed 3 years at Aberdeen’s Gordon's College but then won 2 other bursaries that enabled him to enter the University of Aberdeen, from which he graduated 4 years later. In 1910 he entered Divinity Hall, becoming ordained to the ministry on 17 May 1917. Peddie was Minister of Kennoway United Free Church and then the High United Free Church in Aberdeen followed by 6 years as Minister of Westbourne Church, Barrhead, Glasgow.

Ministry begins and the Gorbals 
Peddie stated in "The Forgotten Talent" that it was in the Gorbals area of Glasgow that he realised his real life work had begun. He stated that his day-to-day life with its duties covered three worlds. The "Ordinary Congregational World" of church members, the "Home Mission World" where he and fellow workers would minister to poorer people, encouraging them to come to church, and lastly the world Peddie described as "The most wonderful and fascinating world of all", the criminal underworld, which was made up of gangs of youths.

Peddie and the gangs 
In his book, Peddie stated that at that time in the Gorbals of Glasgow there were thirty gangs, each consisting of some two hundred members. Confrontations between the gangs often erupted into violent street battles, with innocent passers-by getting caught up and injured. Peddie saw that a major cause of the gang problem was unemployment coupled with American gangster films that glamorised the violent and sometimes fatal lifestyle. Completely undaunted by their fearsome reputation, Peddie reasoned that "... if these lads would not come to church, it was the Church’s duty to go to them." In the two years that followed, Peddie transformed the thirty gangs into thirty "Clubs" which gave the previous gang members a sense of purpose and fulfilment through work schemes such as a firewood factory and an advertising agency among others, all organised by Peddie. Thirty years later, Peddie stated that over seventy five percent of those former gang members went on to be decent, respectable citizens.

Healing ministry and "The Forgotten Talent" 
Peddie’s desire to incorporate healing into his ministry came about in 1942 when he himself became ill after conducting a wedding. While recovering in hospital, he befriended a young man who was terminally ill and was being sent home to die. Peddie lamented the fact that the Church world could do little for the ill man except "... pray with him, comfort and help him to accept his fate." Upon leaving hospital, Peddie determined to change this powerless situation by studying his Bible on the subject of healing. Having studied the scriptures, he became convinced that a minister of the Gospel could and should be able to lay hands on the sick to procure a healing.

Peddie determined to wait before God in prayer for a sign that he was to begin praying for the sick. He states in "The Forgotten Talent" that he received a vision of a large nail driven into the palm of one of his hands. This was the confirmation Peddie had been waiting for, and his healing ministry had begun. In "The Forgotten Talent" there are several chapters devoted to the healings that allegedly took place under Peddie’s ministry. He also saw the need to share his experiences with the aim of training other ministers to take up the ministry of healing.

Peddie made it quite clear that he was in no way against the world of medicine, but rather looked on his ministry as a way of helping a patient after doctors had done all they could. He also stated that praying for a person could help them respond more quickly and effectively to the doctors treatment. At all times Peddie maintained the greatest respect for the world of Medicine, having himself been hospitalised at one point. He stated that during his time in hospital "... the doctors and nurses gave me the kindest possible treatment and constant attention."

Peddie’s book "The Forgotten Talent" was published in 1961 by Oldbourne Books and has gone through several editions since. It is currently out of print.

Peddie died on 14 January 1968 in Kilsyth, Dunbartonshire.

1968 deaths
1887 births
Ministers of the United Free Church of Scotland